Knox Theological Seminary is an independent, evangelical seminary in Fort Lauderdale, Florida, founded in 1989 by D. James Kennedy. The school offers ministry training at its residential facility in Fort Lauderdale and through its internet campus, Knox Online.

History 
Named after the Scottish reformer John Knox, Knox Theological Seminary was founded in 1989 by D. James Kennedy (1930–2007), Senior pastor of Coral Ridge Presbyterian Church. Kennedy wanted to build an institution that would teach and equip men and women to become pastors, teachers, evangelists, and lay workers who would fulfill the Great Commission and impact all aspects of culture. The goal, he said, was to train ministers who would "stand for truth without compromise and have a zeal for evangelism."

The school graduated its first class in 1993 and was granted accreditation by the Association of Theological Schools in 2005. Knox obtained ATS approval in 2012 to offer two master's degree programs (Biblical and Theological Studies, Christianity and Culture) entirely online. Knox Seminary was a subsidiary of Coral Ridge Presbyterian Church for the first 24 years of its existence but became an independent free-standing institution under the exclusive governance of its board of directors on July 1, 2013.

Academics 
Knox has 35 full-time, adjunct, and visiting instructors, including Gerald Bray, Distinguished Professor of Historical Theology; Bryan Chapell, Distinguished Professor of Preaching; and Bruce Waltke, Distinguished Professor of Old Testament.

Knox currently offers four degree programs: Doctor of Ministry (D.Min.), Master of Divinity (M.Div.), Master of Arts (MA) in Christian and Classical Studies, and Master of Arts (Biblical and Theological Studies). It also offers several certificate programs.

Governance 
Knox is governed by a board of directors. Knox Seminary's board installed Samuel Lamerson (Ph.D. TEDS under Scot McKnight) as the president in November 2014. Lamerson was professor of New Testament before taking on the presidency.

Coral Ridge Presbyterian Church granted independence to Knox on July 1, 2013, to allow the school to maximize opportunities afforded by an independent status. Knox continues to have a close relationship with Coral Ridge Presbyterian Church, including 25% board membership.

References 

Reformed church seminaries and theological colleges
Seminaries and theological colleges in Florida
Education in Fort Lauderdale, Florida
Educational institutions established in 1989
Universities and colleges in Broward County, Florida
1989 establishments in Florida